Ioannis George (Yannís) Kevrekidis is currently the Bloomberg Distinguished Professor in Chemical and Biomolecular Engineering within the Whiting School of Engineering, Johns Hopkins University. He holds secondary appointments in the Whiting School's Department of Applied Mathematics & Statistics and the Johns Hopkins University School of Medicine's Department of Urology.

Early life and education 
Yannis was born and grew up in Athens, Greece. He earned a diploma in chemical engineering from the National Technical University of Athens in 1981.  He subsequently earned a master's degree in mathematics from the University of Minnesota in 1986.  At the same time, he worked towards a doctorate in chemical engineering from the University of Minnesota in 1987, under the supervision of Lanny D. Schmidt. His thesis was titled, "On the Dynamics of Chemical Reactions and Reactors".  He published eight journal articles with his advisors including:

I. Kevrekidis, R. Aris, L.D. Schmidt "Rate Multiplicity and Oscillations in Single Species Surface Reactions", Surface Science 102, 459, (1983).
I. Kevrekidis, R. Aris, L.D. Schmidt "On the Dynamics of Peridically Forced Chemical Reactors", Chem. Eng. Comm. 30, 323, (1984).
I. Kevrekidis, R. Aris, L.D. Schmidt "Forcing on Entire Bifurcation Diagram: Case Studies in Chemical Oscillators", Physica D, 23, 391, (1986).

Kevrekidis completed a post-doctoral fellowship at Los Alamos National Laboratory (1985-1986) in the Center for Nonlinear Studies and Theoretical Division.

Career and research 
Kevrekidis joined Princeton University in 1986 as an assistant professor of engineering.  He was promoted to associate professor in 1991 and full professor in 1994.   In 2007, he became the Pomeroy and Betty Perry Smith Professor of Engineering, a position which he held until 2017.  At the same time, he was an associated faculty member in the Princeton Department of Mathematics and senior faculty member in the program in Applied and Computational Mathematics.  In 2017, he became the Bloomberg Distinguished Professor at Johns Hopkins University in the Departments of Chemical and Biomolecular Engineering, Applied Mathematics and Statistics, and Urology.

His research interests include scientific computation for complex/multiscale systems modeling;
process dynamics, computer modeling, and applied mathematics; spatiotemporal pattern formation; and nonlinear system identification and control. His research has also focused on the dynamic behavior of physical, chemical, and biological processes; the types of instabilities they exhibit; the patterns they form; and their computational study. Kevrekidis developed what he named the “equation-free” approach to complex systems modeling and is now working on linking it with modern data mining and machine learning techniques in what could be called an “equation-free and variable-free” approach.

Honors and awards 
In 2003 he was awarded the J.D. Crawford Prize of the Society for Industrial and Applied Mathematics for outstanding research in nonlinear science. 

In 2010, the American Institute of Chemical Engineers awarded him the Richard H. Wilhelm Award in Chemical Reaction Engineering.

In 2017, Kevrekidis was elected to the American Academy of Arts and Sciences, class I (Mathematical and Physical Sciences), Section 5 (Engineering Sciences and Technologies).  His election citation states:

Until June 30, 2017, he was the Pomeroy and Betty Perry Smith Professor of Engineering and Professor of Chemical and Biological Engineering with the School of Engineering and Applied Science at Princeton University.

In 2020, Kevrekidis was elected to the National Academy of Engineering.

Other honors include but are not limited to:
 David and Lucile Packard Foundation Fellowship (1988) 
NSF Presidential Young Investigator Award (1989)
AIChE Colburn Award, 1994
J.S. Guggenheim Fellow, 2005
AIChE Wilhelm Award 2010 
AIChE Fellow, 2016

Kevrekidis has also participated in numerous fellowships including the Distinguished Visiting Fellowship of the Einstein Foundation and Zuse Institute (2016–2018), the Hans Fischer Senior Fellowship of the Institute for Advanced Study in Munich (2015-2018), and the Microsoft Fellowship of the Isaac Newton Institute (2013).

Selected works 
Kevrekidis has more than 22,000 citations in Google Scholar and an h-index of 79.

Google Scholar citations
Ioannis G Kevrekidis, Basil Nicolaenko, James C Scovel "Back in the saddle again: a computer assisted study of the Kuramoto–Sivashinsky equation", SIAM Journal on Applied Mathematics, 50(3), 760-790 (1990).
Michael D Graham, Ioannis G Kevrekidis "Alternative Approaches to the Karhunen-Loève Decomposition for Model Reduction and Data Analysis", Computers & Chemical Engineering 20(5), 495-506 (1996).
Constantinos Theodoropoulos, Yue-Hong Qian, Ioannis G Kevrekidis ""Coarse" stability and bifurcation analysis using time-steppers: A reaction-diffusion example", Proceedings of the National Academy of Sciences, 97(18), 9840-9843 (2000).
Ioannis G Kevrekidis, C William Gear, James M Hyman, Panagiotis G Kevrekidid, Olof Runborg, Constantinos Theodoropoulos "Equation-free, coarse-grained multiscale computation: Enabling microscopic simulators to perform system-level analysis", Communications in Mathematical Sciences, 1(4), 715-762 (2003).
Boaz Nadler, Stéphane Lafon, Ronald R Coifman, Ioannis G Kevrekidis "Diffusion maps, spectral clustering and reaction coordinates of dynamical systems", Applied and Computational Harmonic Analysis, 21(1), 113-127 (2006).

References

External links
Johns Hopkins Faculty page for Yannis Kevrekidis (2017)
Princeton Faculty Page for Yannis Kevrekidis
Google Scholar profile for Yannis Kevrekidis

Living people
21st-century American mathematicians
American chemical engineers
Greek chemical engineers
Minnesota CEMS
University of Minnesota College of Liberal Arts alumni
Johns Hopkins University faculty
Princeton University faculty
National Technical University of Athens alumni
Greek emigrants to the United States
Greek academics
Greek inventors
1959 births
Engineers from Athens